Fenner Baptist Church, also known as Fenner Community Church, is a historic Baptist church at 3122 Bingley Road in Fenner, New York. The resultant building is three bays wide and four bays deep, with a gable roof and engaged, projecting central tower.

It was listed on the National Register of Historic Places in 2002.

References

Baptist churches in New York (state)
Churches on the National Register of Historic Places in New York (state)
Second Empire architecture in New York (state)
Federal architecture in New York (state)
Churches completed in 1821
Churches in Madison County, New York
National Register of Historic Places in Madison County, New York